Alexis De Veaux (born September 24, 1948) is a black, lesbian American writer and illustrator. She chaired the Department of Women's Studies, at the State University of New York at Buffalo. Her surname also appears as DeVeaux.

Life
She was born on September 24, 1948, in Harlem.  In 1976 De Veaux received her BA from State University of New York Empire State College. De Veaux received her MA and PhD from the University of Buffalo.  She wrote for Essence magazine, from 1979 to 1991.

Works
Na-Ni, Harper & Row, 1973
Spirits in the street, Anchor Press, 1974
Gap Tooth Girlfriends: An Anthology, Gap Tooth Girlfriends Publications, 1981
Blue Heat: A Portfolio of Poems & Drawings, Diva Pub. Associates, 1985This Far by Faith: A Writer's Autobiography, State University of New York at Buffalo, 1989Don't Explain: A Song of Billie Holiday, Writers & Readers Publishing, Incorporated, 1988, Yabo, Redbone Press, 2014

 Awards 
 1972: Short story Remember Him, an Outlaw received National Black Fiction Award.
 1972: First prize from Black Creation for a short story.
 1973 best production award from Westchester Community College Drama Festival for Circles.
 1974: NA-NI received Brooklyn Museum of Art Books for Children Award.
 1981: Don't Explain: A Song of Billie Holiday appeared on the American Library Association's Best Books for Young Adults list.
 1981: National Endowment for the Arts fellow
 1982: Unity in Media Award
 1984: MADRE Humanitarian Award
 1984: Fannie Lou Hamer Award
 1988: An Enchanted Hair Tale received American Library Association Coretta Scott King Award.
 1991: An Enchanted Hair Tale received Lorraine Hansberry Award for Excellence in Children's Literature.
 2005: Warrior Poet: A Biography of Audre Lorde'' received the Hurston-Wright Legacy Award

References

External links

1948 births
Living people
University at Buffalo faculty
University at Buffalo alumni
Empire State College alumni
20th-century American women writers
Lambda Literary Award for Lesbian Fiction winners
LGBT African Americans
LGBT people from New York (state)
American lesbian writers
American women academics
20th-century American writers
21st-century American women writers
21st-century American writers
People from Harlem
Writers from Manhattan
Lesbian academics
20th-century African-American women writers
20th-century African-American writers
21st-century African-American women writers
21st-century African-American writers
21st-century American LGBT people